The Lake-class patrol vessel was a class of patrol vessels built in 1974 for the Royal New Zealand Navy by the British boat builders Brooke Marine.

There were four boats in the class:

 HMNZS Pukaki (P3568)
 HMNZS Rotoiti (P3569)
 HMNZS Taupo (P3570)
 HMNZS Hawea (P3571)

All the boats were commissioned in 1975 and decommissioned in 1991

See also
Patrol boats of the Royal New Zealand Navy
Lake class patrol vessels being transported by M.V. Starman 1974

Notes

References

 McDougall, R J  (1989) New Zealand Naval Vessels. Page 98-100. Government Printing Office. 

Patrol boat classes
 
1974 ships